Cecidochares fluminensis is a species of tephritid or fruit flies in the genus Cecidochares of the family Tephritidae.

Distribution
Mexico, Guatemala, Costa Rica, Panama, Venezuela, Trinidad, Brazil.

References

Tephritinae
Insects described in 1934
Diptera of South America